Phyllonorycter turugisana is a moth of the family Gracillariidae. It is known from the islands of Shikoku, Kyushu and Hokkaido in Japan.

The wingspan is about 7 mm.

The larvae feed on Carpinus cordata, Carpinus laxiflora and Ostrya japonica. They probably mine the leaves of their host plant.

References

turugisana
Moths of Japan

Moths described in 1963
Taxa named by Tosio Kumata